GLS may refer to:

 Games, Learning & Society Conference
 GBAS landing system
 General Logistics Systems, a Dutch logistics company
 Generalized least squares
 General lighting service lamps
 Genesis Lease, a Bermudan aircraft leasing company

 Global location sensing

 Georgetown Leadership Seminar
 Glaisdale railway station, in England
 Glasgow Literary Society
 Global Leaders' Summit
 Global Linguist Solutions, an American translation company
 Gloucestershire, England
 GLS Bank, a German ethical bank
 GLS University, in Ahmedabad, India
 Glutaminase gene and enzyme
 Government Legal Service of the Government of the United Kingdom
 Gray leaf spot, a fungal plant disease
 Guided Local Search, a search algorithm
 Guy L. Steele Jr. (born 1954), American computer scientist
 Mercedes-Benz GLS-Class (GL-Class prior to 2016), a full-size luxury SUV
 Scholes International Airport at Galveston, in Texas
 University of Chicago Graduate Library School